Marie Curie, une femme sur le front (English: Marie Curie, a woman on the front) is a Franco-Belgian drama historical television film directed by  and starring Dominique Reymond. It was broadcast on April 25, 2014 on RTBF and November 11, 2014 on France 2.

The fictional scenes are interspersed with many sequences from filmed archives including, at the end of the movie, several sequences where Marie Curie herself appears.

Synopsis 

Marie Curie, Nobel laureate in physics and chemistry, directs the Radium Institute when World War I breaks out in 1914. She equips a first van with X-ray equipment and goes to the site of the Battle of the Marne. The field hospital she takes care of becomes notable for the few deaths recorded. In addition to the help of Doctor Claudius Regaud, one of her collaborators who works on the treatment of cancer by radiotherapy, Marie Curie receives that of her 17-year-old daughter, Irène. She quickly equips other vehicles, nicknamed by the soldiers “the ”. Following the different fronts, her work becomes recognised and radiography, which until then was mainly an amusement for the public, became a precious aid for medicine.

Cast 

 Dominique Reymond as Marie Curie
 Fanny Dumont as Irène Curie
  as Pierre Curie
 Epona Guillaume as Ève Curie
 Laurent Bateau as Claudius Regaud
 Olivier Bonjour as Wilhelm Röntgen
 Jean-Luc Couchard as head surgeon
 Patrick Descamps as Louis Ragot
 Guillaume Dolmans as Justin Godart
  as surgeon at the hotel
 Éric Godon as president Poincaré
  as old doctor
  as soldier Brugalin
 Damien Marchal
  as Émile Roux
  as 
  as nurse

Awards 

References 
Belgian television films
French television films
France Télévisions television dramas
Biographical television films
Curie family
Radiology